Schizovalva stasiarcha is a moth of the family Gelechiidae. It was described by Edward Meyrick in 1913. It is found in South Africa.

The wingspan is 15–16 mm. The forewings are shining white with a broad dark purplish-fuscous median longitudinal band from the base to the apex. The hindwings are grey whitish or grey.

References

Endemic moths of South Africa
Moths described in 1913
Schizovalva